John Harcourt Turner (born 22 April 1949), was deputy leader of the National Party in New South Wales from 1999 to 2003 and a Member of the New South Wales Legislative Assembly representing Myall Lakes between 1988 and 2011 for the National Party.

He was educated at Aberdare Primary School and Sydney Grammar School.  He received a Diploma of Law and practiced as a solicitor and tax agent before entering Parliament.  Since entering Parliament he has received a Bachelor of Letters from Deakin University and a Bachelor of Arts from Murdoch University.

References

 

Members of the New South Wales Legislative Assembly
National Party of Australia members of the Parliament of New South Wales
Living people
1949 births
21st-century Australian politicians